is a Japanese football player, who plays for Fujieda MYFC as a midfielder.

Career
Iwabuchi attended Meiji University from 2009 to 2012. With Toyofumi Sakano, he was recognised as one of the best prospects in the country.

Born as forward, he developed into a side-midfielder. After university, he signed for Matsumoto Yamaga before being loaned first to JFL-side Renofa Yamaguchi, then to J3 FC Ryūkyū.

From January 2016, he moved definitely to SC Sagamihara.

Club statistics
Updated to 23 February 2018.

Personal life
Iwabuchi has a younger sister, Mana, who is also a professional footballer and has been capped at international level for Japan.

References

External links
Profile at Fujieda MYFC
Profile at SC Sagamihara

1990 births
Living people
Meiji University alumni
Association football people from Tokyo Metropolis
Japanese footballers
J2 League players
J3 League players
Japan Football League players
Matsumoto Yamaga FC players
Renofa Yamaguchi FC players
FC Ryukyu players
SC Sagamihara players
Iwate Grulla Morioka players
Association football midfielders
People from Musashino, Tokyo